Mason "Racin'" Barbera (born 10 November 1997 in Bundaberg) is a racing driver from Australia. He previously competeted in the Dunlop Super2 Series for Garry Rogers Motorsport.

Career results

References

Australian racing drivers
1997 births
Living people
Sportspeople from Bundaberg
Garry Rogers Motorsport drivers